Megadonichthys kurikae is an extinct species of fish belonging to the family Osteolepididae.

It is found in Estonia.

References

Tetrapodomorphs
Prehistoric lobe-finned fish genera
Fossil taxa described in 2004